A loose box, also loose-box or loosebox is a stall or compartment in a stable or railway truck large enough for a horse (or other large animal) to move around unrestrained.
The first stall was a large square one, shut in behind with a wooden gate; the others were common stalls, good stalls, but not nearly so large; it had a low rack for hay and a low manger for corn; it was called a loose box, because the horse that was put into it was not tied up, but left loose, to do as he liked. It is a great thing to have a loose box.

References

Stables
Buildings and structures used to confine animals
Horse management